Best Pal (February 12, 1988 – November 24, 1998) was an American Hall of Fame champion racehorse, who retired as the all time record for purses of any California-bred earning (since surpassed) for his owners, the Golden Eagle Farm, US$5.6 million over his lifetime.

Background
Best Pal was a brown gelding bred by John & Betty Mabee. Best Pal was a descendant of Princequillo on both his sire's and dam's line. He was gelded at an early age due to being "studdish and unmanageable".

Racing career
Best Pal won the first running of the Pacific Classic at Del Mar, and finished second in the 1991 Kentucky Derby. He won the Hollywood Gold Cup and the Santa Anita Handicap, thus capturing all three of California's premier handicap races. In all, Best Pal won 18 races—17 of them stakes—nearly all in California.

Retirement
Retired in 1996, Best Pal had a massive heart attack while on his way to a training track at Golden Eagle Farm. He was buried at the farm, and a large boulder with a plaque covers his grave. Best Pal was voted into the National Museum of Racing and Hall of Fame in 2010.

Pedigree

References

1988 racehorse births
1998 racehorse deaths
Racehorses bred in California
Thoroughbred family 2-h
Racehorses trained in the United States
American Grade 1 Stakes winners
United States Thoroughbred Racing Hall of Fame inductees